Anahim Peak, also spelled Anaham, ʔAnaghim, or Anaheim, is a volcanic cone in the Anahim Volcanic Belt in British Columbia, Canada, located  northwest of Anahim Lake and  east of Tsitsutl Peak.  It was formed when the North American Plate moved over a hotspot, similar to the one feeding the Hawaiian Islands, called the Anahim hotspot. It is one of the several volcanoes in the Anahim Volcanic Belt that stands out all by itself, rising from the Chilcotin Plateau, between the Rainbow Range and the Ilgachuz Range and near the headwaters of the Dean River.

Name
The Carrier (Dakelh) name for Anahim Peak is Bes But'a, meaning "obsidian peak." To the Tsilhqot'in Nation, the mountain is called Bis Nadiʔah (also meaning "obsidian peak"),  or Tŝi-bis Gunlin Xadalgwenlh ("mountain where there is obsidian stone"). The word bes (bis in Tŝilhqot’in) is anglicised as "beece", another word for obsidian and also an early designation for this mountain. The name Anahim is that of Chief Anahim, a leader of the Tsilhqot'in people in the mid-19th Century.

Area and history
Anahim Peak was a significant source of obsidian for the Nuxalk, Tsilhqot'in, and Dakelh peoples. Obsidian was desirable because extremely sharp arrowheads and cutting knives could be made from it. It was also used for jewellery. Anahim obsidian was traded widely all over the BC Interior and up and down the Coast from Bella Coola. Red ochre was used in paint and decoration was also taken from this area. Anahim Peak is not far from the small community of Anahim Lake.

See also
List of volcanoes of Canada
Anahim hotspot
Anahim Volcanic Belt
Volcanism in Canada
Anahim (disambiguation)

References

Anahim Volcanic Belt
Volcanic plugs of British Columbia
Miocene volcanoes
One-thousanders of British Columbia
Landforms of the Chilcotin
Polygenetic volcanoes
Range 3 Coast Land District